Vakil Caravanserai is located in the southern Iranian city of Kerman. It is one of the largest Caravanserais in the world.
Old Iran  had many Caravanserais for long distance travelers to rest. Vakil Caravanserai has 120 rooms in two floors. It was built around 1870 by the order of Mohammad Ismail Khan, the time governor of Kerman. The whole building was completed around 1870. This is one of the caravanserais which exist in Kerman.

Architecture 
Vakil caravanserai consists of two floors and has 120 rooms. The number of rooms is on the first floor to 81 and on the second floor to 31.Caravanserai has two doors opening to Vakil market(Bazar-i Vakil).  The entrance facade to Vakil caravanserai, which opens into the market is decorated with tiles. This is the same from outside porch. One of the most valuable features of this caravanserai is its windshield Which has its own reputation and beauty. Another historical attraction is the clock tower which has a long history how it got to Iran.

Gallery

References

Caravanserais in Iran
Kerman Province
Kerman